Dharmasthali is a village and former Village Development Committee that is now part of  Tarakeshwar Municipality in Kathmandu District in Province No. 3 of central Nepal. At the time of the 2011 Nepal census it had a population of 6,530 and had 1,421 households in it.

Dharmasthali is popular for its religion & culture of its native Newa village, and Mahankal temple on the top of a hillock and is only four kilometers from Balaju Ring Road. You can also find Buddhist stupa in Dharmasthali. The popular festival of Dharmasthali is on Panha Chahre also commonly known as Ghode Jatra for 5 days. Dharmasthali has also been mentioned in the Gosainkunda, Silu poem. It has been mentioned that Dharmasthali used to be a place of homestay for the pilgrims travelling to Gosainkunda.

Dharmasthali Village Development Committee Consists of 9 wards. Dharmasthali consists of the natives Newa. The main  communities are Newa, chettri, and Brahmin.
There are about 600 of Newa's and 500 houses of timilsina family .

References

Populated places in Kathmandu District